Susy Derqui was an Argentine actress and cabaret performer.

Selected filmography
 Radio Bar (1936)
 Outside the Law (1937)
 Margarita, Armando y su padre (1939)
 Vida nocturna (1955)

References

Bibliography 
 Toni, Luis Pedro. Evita de Los Millones. Corregidor, 2006.

External links 
 

Year of birth unknown
Year of death unknown
Argentine film actresses
20th-century Argentine actresses